Cassandra Dimovski (born 27 December 1993) is an Australian football (soccer) goalkeeper who most recently played for the Melbourne Victory in the W-League, the top division of women's soccer in Australia.

Early life
Dimovski was raised in Lower Plenty, a suburb of Melbourne, Victoria where she attended Templestowe College. At age 14, she was scouted by a teacher to play for club team Eltham Redbacks. Originally playing as a midfielder, she changed to the goalkeeper position. Dimovski also played for club team Box Hill Inter where she played with Matildas goalkeeper and captain Melissa Barbieri.

Playing career

Club

Melbourne Victory, 2011–2016
Primarily playing for the Melbourne Victory as a backup goalkeeper, Dimovski earned caps for the team in December 2013 after the team's primary goalkeeper Brianna Davey was injured and helped the team finish third during the regular season. After advancing to the playoffs, the Victory eventually won the Grand Final.

In October 2015, it was announced that Dimovski was one of three Australian Victory players to return to the squad for the 2015–16 season.

International
In 2012, Dimovski played for the Victorian National Training Centre (NTC) Girls Team in consideration for the senior national team.

Honours
Team
 W-League Grand Final Runners Up: 2013
 W-League Grand Final Winners: 2014

See also

References

Further reading
 Grainey, Timothy (2012), Beyond Bend It Like Beckham: The Global Phenomenon of Women's Soccer, University of Nebraska Press, 
 Stewart, Barbara (2012), Women's Soccer: The Passionate Game, Greystone Books,

External links 

 Melbourne Victory player profile

1993 births
Living people
Melbourne Victory FC (A-League Women) players
A-League Women players
Australian women's soccer players
Soccer players from Melbourne
Australian people of Macedonian descent
Women's association football goalkeepers
People from the City of Banyule